Ebenopsis ebano is a species of flowering plant in the family Fabaceae, that is native to the coastal plain of southern Texas in the United States and eastern Mexico. It is commonly known as Texas ebony or ebano (in Spanish).

Description

Habitat and range
The range of E. ebano stretches from Laredo and Corpus Christi, Texas south through the states of Tamaulipas, Nuevo León, San Luis Potosí, Veracruz, Campeche, and Yucatán in Mexico. It can be found in the Tamaulipan matorral, Tamaulipan mezquital, Veracruz dry forests, and Yucatán dry forests ecoregions.

Uses
Texas ebony is cultivated in xeriscaping for its dense foliage and fragrant flowers. It is also used in bonsai.

Ecology
Ebenopsis ebano is a host plant for the caterpillars of the coyote cloudywing (Achalarus toxeus) and Sphingicampa blanchardi. The seedpods host the bean weevils Stator beali and S. limbatus. Despite the native range of Texas ebony overlapping with that of the latter, S. limbatus only feeds upon it in locales where it is grown as an ornamental and is not native. E. ebano is also a preferred host of the epiphyte Bailey's ball moss (Tillandsia baileyi).

References

External links

Mimosoids
Trees of Mexico
Flora of Texas
Garden plants of North America
Plants used in bonsai
Plants described in 1996